The lexicon of a language (or field of study) is its complete vocabulary.

Lexicon may also refer to:

Reference works
 A dictionary
 An encyclopedic dictionary
 A word list
 The Suda, sometimes cited as the Suda Lexicon or Suidias's Lexicon

Arts and entertainment

Fiction
 Lexicon (novel), a 2013 novel by Max Barry
 The Harry Potter Lexicon, sometimes referred to as the Lexicon
 Lexicon, the home planet of WordGirl, star of an educational TV show

Gaming
 Lexicon (game), a role-playing game using Wiki software
 Lexicon Gaming Convention, board games event held in Lexington, Kentucky, USA
 Lexicon, a 1932 card game from Waddingtons
 A list of acceptable Scrabble words

Music
 Lexicon (Will Young album), 2019
 Lexicon (Isyana Sarasvati album), 2019
 Lex Icon, a stage name used by Norwegian black metal musician Stian Arnesen (or Nagash)
 "Lexicon", by Neurosis from Enemy of the Sun, 1993

Buildings
 DLR Lexicon, a building in Dún Laoghaire, Ireland
 Lexicon Tower, tower block near Old Street Roundabout in London

Businesses
 Lexicon (company), an audio equipment manufacturer
 Lexicon Branding, a company devoted to inventing names for products
 Lexicon Pharmaceuticals, a biopharmaceutical company

Computing
 Lexicon (program), a text editor and word processor 
 Lexicon (typeface), a typeface designed by Bram de Does

Mathematics
 Lexicon (mathematics), a real number that is disjunctive to every base

See also 
 Lexical (disambiguation)
 Lexicography, the art of compiling dictionaries or the study of the lexicon 
 Lexicology, the scientific study of individual words
 Lexis (disambiguation), a noun with similar meanings